A nosegay, posy, or tussie-mussie is a small flower bouquet, typically given as a gift. They have existed in some form since at least medieval times, when they were carried or worn around the head or bodice. Doilies are traditionally used to bind the stems in these arrangements. Alternatively, "posy holders", available in a variety of shapes and materials (although often silver), enable the wearing of these arrangements "at the waist, in the hair, or secured with a brooch".

The term nosegay arose in fifteenth-century Middle English as a combination of nose and gay (the latter then meaning "ornament"). A nosegay is, thus, an ornament that appeals to the nose or nostril.

The term  (also ) comes from the reign of Queen Victoria (1837–1901), when the small bouquets became a popular fashion accessory. Typically, tussie-mussies include floral symbolism from the language of flowers, and therefore may be used to send a message to the recipient. In modern times the term specifically refers to small bouquets in a conical metal holder, or the holder itself, particularly when used at a white wedding.

See also
 Corsage
 Floral design
 Floristry
 Ring a Ring o' Roses
 Sachet

References

Fashion accessories
Floristry
Flowers